Ray Monette is an American musician born on May 7, 1946.

He started his career as a session musician with Motown. He was also a songwriter and, in 1967 Detroit started a band called The Abstract Reality, who released a 45 rpm single "Love Burns Like A Fire Inside".<ref
 name=SportRecords104> (Note: side B: ib. instrumental version)</ref> He formed Scorpion with Mike Campbell, Bob 'Babbitt' Kreinar and Andrew Smith. His name appears on Scorpion and Meat Loaf's debut album Stoney & Meatloaf (1971). For that recording, Monette co-wrote four songs.<ref
 name=Scorpion></ref> That same year, he played tenor guitar on "Evolution" by Dennis Coffey & the Detroit Guitar Band,<ref
 name=Coffey>
 (Sussex SXBS 7004 - 1971)</ref> and played a guitar solo on Funkadelic's "I Got A Thing, You Got A Thing, Everybody's Got A Thing". He was guitarist and singer for Rare Earth from 1971 until 2004 (with a break around 1977).
Ray played guitar on one of Rare Earth's most memorable singles, "I Just Want To Celebrate" and was the guitarist on the gold-selling 1971 live album, "Rare Earth In Concert" (which had a unique album cover design, like a backpack, with a flap opening).
In 2010, Monette played on the Phil Collins album Going Back.

References

1946 births
Living people

American male musicians
Singers from Detroit
American male singer-songwriters
Singer-songwriters from Michigan